Sir Geoff Mulgan CBE (born 1961) is Professor of Collective Intelligence, Public Policy and Social Innovation at University College London (UCL). From 2011 to 2019 he was Chief Executive of the National Endowment for Science Technology and the Arts (NESTA) and Visiting Professor at University College London, the London School of Economics, and the University of Melbourne. In 2020, he joined the Nordic think tank Demos Helsinki as a Fellow.

Previously he was:
CEO of the Young Foundation based in London
Director of the Prime Minister's Strategy Unit (and before that Director of the Performance and Innovation Unit)
Director of Policy at 10 Downing Street under British Prime Minister Tony Blair
Co-founder and Director of the London-based think tank Demos (from 1993 to 1998)
Chief adviser to Gordon Brown MP in the early 1990s

Mulgan obtained a first-class degree from Balliol College, Oxford and a PhD in telecommunications from the University of Westminster. He was also a Fellow at the Massachusetts Institute of Technology, trained as a Buddhist monk in Sri Lanka, and worked for a spell during the 1980s as a van driver for the "Labour-supporting collective of musicians and comedians known as Red Wedge", opting ultimately for a career in local government and academia in the UK and going on to become an influential writer on social and political issues in various newspapers and magazines in the 1990s, including The Independent, the Financial Times, The Guardian, and the New Statesman. He worked as a reporter for BBC television and radio, and was made a CBE in 2005.

He has written a number of books, including Communication and Control: Networks and the New Economies of Communication (1991), Politics in an Anti-Political Age (1994), Connexity (1997), Good and Bad Power: the Ideals and Betrayals of Government (Penguin, 2006), The Art of Public Strategy (2009), The Locust and the Bee (Princeton, 2013), Big Mind: how collective intelligence can change our world (Princeton, 2017); Social innovation: how societies find the power to change (Policy Press, 2019); and Another World is Possible: how to reignite social and political imagination (Hurst/Oxford University Press, 2022). His books have been translated into many languages including Chinese, Japanese, Russian, Malay, German, Turkish, Punjabi, Italian, Korean, Hungarian and Arabic.

He has written numerous reports and pamphlets for Demos, the Young Foundation, Nesta, and Demos Helsinki. He has lectured and advised governments around the world on policy and strategy – including China, Australia, the United States, Japan, and Russia – and is seen as one of the pioneers of various fields including the creative economy, social and public innovation. He is profiled in two books: The New Alchemists (1999, by Charles Handy), and Visionaries (2001, by Jay Walljasper).

He has founded or co-founded many organisations including: Demos, the Young Foundation, the Social Innovation Exchange (SIX), Uprising, Studio Schools Trust, Action for Happiness, the Alliance for Useful Evidence, States of Change, The Australian Centre for Social Innovation, Maslaha and Nesta Italia.  He is a founding editor-in-chief of the journal Collective Intelligence, published by Sage and ACM.

He has been chair of various organisations including the Social Innovation Exchange; Involve; Nesta Italia and the Studio Schools Trust. He was co-chair of the London LEP Digital, Science, Technology and Arts group under then London Mayor Boris Johnson. He has been a board member of Big Society Capital and a trustee of charities including Action for Happiness; the Photographers Gallery; Reimagine Europa; Luton Culture Trust; the Design Council, the Work Foundation, Crime Concern,  and Political Quarterly, and a member of various committees for bodies including the European Commission, World Economic Forum, OECD, SITRA and the Academy of Medical Science. He has given TED talks on the global economy, education, and happiness.

In 2007-2008 Mulgan was an Adelaide Thinker in Residence, advising South Australian Premier Mike Rann on social innovation and social inclusion policies. As a result of Mulgan's recommendations, the Rann Government established The Australian Centre for Social Innovation. From 2016 to 2019, Mulgan was a senior visiting scholar at the Ash Center in the Kennedy School at Harvard University. From 2019 to 2022 he is a World Economic Forum Schwab Fellow. On 19 July 2010, he was awarded an honorary degree of Doctor of Social Science (DSoc Sci) by Nottingham Trent University.  He was awarded an honorary fellowship by Cardiff University in 2022.

Mulgan was knighted in the Queen's 2020 Birthday Honours for services to the creative economy.

References

1961 births
Living people
Alumni of the University of Westminster
People educated at Westminster School, London
Academics of University College London
Academics of the London School of Economics
Commanders of the Order of the British Empire
People from Harringay
Harkness Fellows
British special advisers
BBC newsreaders and journalists
Alumni of Balliol College, Oxford
Knights Bachelor
Labour Party (UK) people